Sun Zi Bing Fa Yu San Shi Liu Ji, literally Sun Tzu's The Art of War and the Thirty-Six Stratagems, is a Chinese television series first broadcast in 2000. Set in the Warring States period of ancient China, the series tells the story of Sun Bin, a descendant of Sun Tzu, and his rival Pang Juan.

List of episodes
Each episode is named after one of the Thirty-Six Stratagems.

Cast
 Chou Yongli as Sun Bin
 Yang Hongwu as Pang Juan
 Zhang Xiaolei as Zhongli Chun
 Zhang Zijian as Gongsun Yue
 Gu Hongwei as Zhongli Qiu
 Han Fuli as Tian Ji

External links

  Sun Zi Bing Fa Yu San Shi Liu Ji on Youku

Television series set in the Zhou dynasty
2000 Chinese television series debuts
Mandarin-language television shows
Sun Tzu
Chinese historical television series